Barhya Lal Singh is a village in Domariaganj, Siddharthnagar district, Uttar Pradesh, India.

References

Villages in Siddharthnagar district